The magpie shrike (Urolestes melanoleucus), also known as the African long-tailed shrike, is a species of bird in the family Laniidae. It is monotypic within the genus Urolestes. It is native to the grasslands of eastern and southeastern Africa, where its natural habitats are dry savannah, moist savannah, and subtropical or tropical dry shrubland. It has a very wide range and is common in places, and the International Union for Conservation of Nature has assessed its conservation status as being of "least concern".

Distribution and habitat

The magpie shrike is found in Angola, Botswana, Eswatini, Kenya, Mozambique, Namibia, South Africa, Tanzania, Zambia, and Zimbabwe. It inhabits open savannah with scattered acacia trees, close-grazed turf and bare ground, in parts of southern and central Africa where precipitation mainly occurs between November and April. Arid areas are avoided but semi-arid areas may be favoured. It also occurs in woodland, particularly riparian areas, and in the Kruger National Park is found in river valleys with thorny mopane trees.

Ecology
The magpie shrike is a gregarious species and usually occurs in noisy groups of about a dozen birds occupying a home range of several tens of hectares. It may associate with other birds such as the white-headed buffalo weaver (Dinemellia dinemelli). The birds nest cooperatively during the rainy season, and their breeding territory is about three hectares and defended from other groups. Displays in the breeding season include bowing, tail flicking, wing raising and whistling. The female sometimes calls from the nest and the male brings her food. The two birds may also perform duets.

This bird perches in an elevated position scanning the ground below for possible prey. Most prey is caught on the ground, but flying insects are sometimes caught in mid air. The diet consists of arthropods, insects, lizards, small mammals and fruit.

References

External links
 Photos - Tanzanian Birds & Butterflies
 Species text - The Atlas of Southern African Birds

magpie shrike
Birds of Southern Africa
magpie shrike
Taxonomy articles created by Polbot
Taxobox binomials not recognized by IUCN